Lucas Sebastian de Francesco (born 21 September 1981) is a professional football striker currently playing for Unión Mar del Plata. De Francesco scored 12 goals for Kavala in the 2004–05 Greek Gamma Ethniki season.

References

1981 births
Argentine footballers
Kavala F.C. players
Panetolikos F.C. players
Ilioupoli F.C. players
Club Atlético Douglas Haig players
Living people
Association football forwards